Ballarat South was an electoral district of the Legislative Assembly in the Australian state of Victoria. It was created in the redistribution preceding the 1955 election, covering the southern suburbs and the rural areas south of Ballarat.

It was a marginal seat that was always won by the governing party throughout its existence.

Ballarat South was abolished in the redistribution preceding the 1992 election, and was mostly replaced by the new district of Ballarat East.

Members for Ballarat South

Election results

References

Former electoral districts of Victoria (Australia)
1955 establishments in Australia
1992 disestablishments in Australia